Jund Ansar Allah was an armed Islamist organization operating in the Gaza Strip. It was founded in November 2008. On 14 August 2009, the group's spiritual leader, Sheikh Abdel Latif Moussa, announced the establishment of the al-Qaeda inspired Islamic Emirate of Rafah in the Palestinian territories and criticized the ruling power, Hamas, for failing to enforce Sharia law. In response, Hamas attacked the organization, resulting in 24 people being killed, including Moussa, and Jund Ansar Allah ceased to exist.

Background

Jund Ansar Allah was established in November 2008 by Sheikh Abdel Latif Moussa, who had headed a Salafi organization in Gaza since the 1980s, and Khalid Banat (Abu Abdullah Suri), who claimed to have fought with leading al Qaeda figures including Osama bin Laden and Abu Musab al Zarqawi. 

Jund Ansar Allah was an al-Qaeda inspired organization ideologically affiliated with the movement for global jihad. Moussa, an "Egyptian-educated physician-turned-cleric," was the group's spiritual leader. He left his medical practice in Rafah to become one of the most influential preachers in the southern Gaza Strip. In his Friday sermons that attracted thousands of young men, Moussa argued that Hamas had failed to properly institute Sharia law and had become too lenient. Hamas repeatedly warned Moussa and his followers to abandon his mosque in Rafah.

Jund Ansar Allah remained relatively unknown until 8 June 2009 when it launched a military operation against an IDF force near the Nahal Oz border crossing in the northern Gaza Strip. The IDF successfully foiled the attack, which incorporated the use of horses booby-trapped with IEDs and explosives. Five Jund Ansar Allah operatives died in the operation.

The organization also clashed with Hamas. On 22 July 2009, three Jund Ansar Allah militants holed up in a building in Khan Younis surrendered in a standoff with Hamas police.

Armed activities
On 8 June 2009 the group carried out a raid on the Karni border crossing between the Gaza Strip and Israel. Ten individuals from the group rode into battle on horses laden with large quantities of explosives, with at least three of them being shot dead by Israeli troops. Israeli officials said several of the men had been wearing explosive belts, and suspected they had been attempting to kidnap a soldier. 

Hamas officials also blamed the group for the bombings of several internet cafes, seen as a source of immorality, and of a wedding party attended by relatives of the West Bank-based Fatah leader, Muhammad Dahlan, in which fifty people were injured. Jund Ansar Allah denied any responsibility for the latter attack, and Fatah leaders blamed Hamas. In August 2009, a senior Hamas official told The Jerusalem Post that Jund Ansar Allah received its weapons from former Fatah policemen and security officials in the southern Gaza Strip and that the aim of its attacks were to "defame" Hamas.

Ideology

A message issued on the group's website and jihadist forums on the day of the clash with Hamas stated:"The soldiers of Tawhid (monotheism) will not rest ... until the entirety of Muslim lands are liberated and until our imprisoned Aqsa (mosque) is purified from the desecration of the accursed Jews".

See also
Islamic Emirate of Rafah
Army of Islam (Gaza Strip)
Jahafil Al-Tawhid Wal-Jihad fi Filastin

References

External links
Profile: Jund Ansar Allah, BBC News
FACTBOX-Five facts about Jund Ansar Allah, Reuters
Who was Abu Noor al-Maqdisi? (Asharq Al-Awsat)

Islamist groups
Jihadist groups
Defunct Palestinian militant groups
Gaza Strip
2008 establishments in the Palestinian territories
Organizations established in 2008